Pine Hall may refer to:

 Pine Hall, North Carolina, an unincorporated community in Stokes County, North Carolina
 Pine Hall (Pine Hall, North Carolina), listed on the NRHP in North Carolina
 Pine Hall (Raleigh, North Carolina), listed on the NRHP in North Carolina